Say Nuth Khaw Yum Provincial Park, also known as Indian Arm Park, is a provincial park located in the Lower Mainland of British Columbia, Canada. The park was established on July 13, 1995 by BC Parks to protect the forested mountain terrain of Indian Arm.

History
In 1998, a cooperative park management agreement was signed between BC Parks and the Tsleil-Waututh First Nation.

In February 2010, the park name was changed from Indian Arm Provincial Park to Say Nuth Khaw Yum Provincial Park as part of a second cooperative park management agreement between BC Parks and the Tsleil-Waututh First Nation. Say Nuth Khaw Yum means "Serpent’s Land" in Halkomelem, the traditional language of the Tsleil-Waututh First Nation.

Geography
These lands are part of the traditional territory of the Tsleil-Waututh people who have inhabited the area since time immemorial.

The southeastern corner of the park surrounds most of Buntzen Lake, a small reservoir managed by BC Hydro.

This park also contains a number of significant archaeological sites.

Activities

The park's close proximity to the Greater Vancouver metropolitan area makes it a popular destination for recreation. Popular activities include hiking, camping, kayaking, and scuba diving.

The southeastern corner of the park features a well-developed trail system, most of which are rated as moderately difficult.

See also
Golden Ears Provincial Park

References

External links

Lower Mainland
Provincial parks of British Columbia
1995 establishments in British Columbia
Protected areas established in 1995